Ampitiya is a suburb of Kandy, Sri Lanka. It is located within the country's Central Province.

Ampitiya is administratively divided into the two sections of Ampitiya north and Ampitiya South.

Points of interest
Divurum Bodhi Viharaya is a well known Buddhist temple located in Ampitiya.

See also
List of towns in Central Province, Sri Lanka

External links

Ampitiya.com - The Local Lifestyle Magazine
The National Seminary Ampitiya

Populated places in Kandy District